Mount Meager (also known as The Cathedral) is a mountain in the Pacific Ranges of the Coast Mountains in British Columbia, Canada. It represents the second highest peak of the Mount Meager massif, a group of coalescent stratovolcanoes in the Garibaldi Volcanic Belt.

The mountain was the source of the 2010 Mount Meager landslide. On August 6, the southern  peak of Meager collapsed in a series of major rockfalls. The rockfalls transformed into a large debris flow that dammed Meager Creek for about one day. The debris flow also crossed the Lillooet River downstream and wiped out a forestry road on the opposite bank of the Lillooet River.

References

Mount Meager massif
Two-thousanders of British Columbia